Kepler-298d is an exoplanet orbiting Kepler-298, 473.69 parsecs away (1545 ly). Kepler-298d was discovered in 2014, it orbits its star in the Habitable zone. Kepler-298d was thought to be an Earth-like planet, further research shows that its atmosphere is +2.11 on the HZA scale, this means the planet may be an ocean planet with a thick gas atmosphere like a dwarf-giant.

See also
List of potentially habitable exoplanets
Kepler-298

References

Exoplanets discovered in 2014
Super-Earths in the habitable zone
Exoplanets discovered by the Kepler space telescope
Transiting exoplanets